Paul Hampton Adams (December 12, 1919 – September 24, 1995) was an American football player and coach. He played for the Pittsburgh Steelers of the National Football League (NFL) in 1947. Adams served as the head football coach at Morehead State University in Morehead, Kentucky from 1956 to 1958, compiling a record of 4–21–4.

Head coaching record

References

External links
 

1919 births
1995 deaths
American football centers
Morehead State Eagles football coaches
Morehead State Eagles football players
Pittsburgh Steelers players
People from Lawrence County, Ohio
Coaches of American football from Ohio
Players of American football from Ohio